Groo may refer to:

 Groo the Wanderer, a comic book series.
 The Groosalugg, a character in the television show Angel.
 Han Groo, a South Korean actress.

See also 
 Grue (disambiguation)
 GRU (disambiguation)
 Grew
 Grewe